Brigadier General Sir Samuel Augustus Pethebridge,  (3 August 1862 – 26 January 1918) was senior Australian public servant, serving as the Secretary of the Department of Defence in the period 1910–1918. He was acting Secretary for Sir Muirhead Collins (1906–1910). He was also a military administrator, and an army officer.

Pethebridge died, in office and holding rank as brigadier general, in 1918 aged fifty-five, and was buried at Box Hill Cemetery, Melbourne.

References

External links
Roll of Honour, Australian War Memorial
Studio portrait, Australian War Memorial
First World War Embarkation Roll, Australian War Memorial
KCMG, Australian War Memorial
KCMG, It's an Honour

1862 births
1918 deaths
Military personnel from Brisbane
Australian military personnel killed in World War I
Australian generals
Australian Knights Commander of the Order of St Michael and St George
Burials at Box Hill Cemetery
Secretaries of the Australian Department of Defence